Ernesto Fernández (born 9 March 1949) is a Mexican fencer. He competed in the individual and team épée events at the 1968 Summer Olympics.

References

External links
 

1949 births
Living people
Mexican male épée fencers
Olympic fencers of Mexico
Fencers at the 1968 Summer Olympics
Sportspeople from León, Guanajuato
Pan American Games medalists in fencing
Pan American Games bronze medalists for Mexico
Fencers at the 1971 Pan American Games
20th-century Mexican people